Hypenodes caducus, the large hypenodes moth, is a species of moth in the family Erebidae. It was described by Harrison Gray Dyar Jr. in 1907. It is found in North America, including British Columbia, Maryland, Massachusetts, Michigan, Minnesota, New York, Ohio, Ontario, Quebec, South Carolina and Wisconsin.

The wingspan is 12–15 mm.

References

Moths described in 1907
Hypenodinae
Moths of North America